İksir (En: Elixir) is a 2014 Turkish live action/animated film, directed by Birkan Uz. The film went on nationwide general release on May 16, 2014.

Plot
Kerem, who is now a young and extremely popular rock musician, grew up with his little sister, Buse, at his grandfather's farm after losing his parents. The grandpa, an extraordinary inventor, one day comes up with an elixir that enables humans to speak with animals and control their behavior. In order to prevent evil people from obtaining the formula, he keeps it a secret. However, Ökkeş, a boy from the same village who has a crush on Buse, knows about the elixir.

Cast
 Sungun Bsbacan 
 Yusuf Bedirhan
 Cansu Tosun

References

External links
 

2014 films
2014 animated films
Turkish animated films
Films with live action and animation